Minofala is a genus of moths of the family Noctuidae.

Species
 Minofala instans Smith, 1905

References
Natural History Museum Lepidoptera genus database
Minofala at funet

Hadeninae